Nassau Hall is a historic mansion on the grounds of the Muttontown Preserve in Muttontown, New York.  It was built in 1904 for Bronson Winthrop and was known as Muttontown Meadows. It was the first commission of Delano and Aldrich in the area.  Its exterior walls were modeled after Mount Vernon, and was on an estate of 183 acres.

It was purchased by Lansdell Christie in 1950, who sold it to Nassau County in 1969, becoming the headquarters of the Nassau Parks Conservancy.  It was restored in 2010.  It is one of three mansions in the Muttontown Preserve, along with the Benjamin Moore Estate, also known as Chelsea, and the destroyed Knollwood Estate.

References

External links 
 Photographs from Old Long Island

Mansions of Gold Coast, Long Island
Oyster Bay (town), New York
Houses in Nassau County, New York